The Office of the Attorney General of the Republic (Spanish: Procuraduría General de la República) of the Dominican Republic is a government institution belonging to the executive branch that is responsible for representing the Dominican State in courts of law, defending public interest, assuring respect for the due process of law and overseeing penitentiaries in the Republic.

It was established on the 1844 Dominican Constitution as the Secretary of State of Justice and Public Instruction (Secretaría de Estado de Justicia e Instrucción Pública). Its headquarters are located at Santo Domingo, at the Centro de los Héroes, near the Supreme Court and the Congress of the Dominican Republic. Since August 16, 2020, the Attorney General is Miriam Germán Brito.

It is analogous to Departments of Justice or Ministries of Justice in other countries.

History 
The origin of this Ministry can be found on the first Dominican Constitution, signed on November 6, 1844. This document specified that:

Thus, it was established the Secretary of State of Justice and Public Instruction (Secretaría de Estado de Justicia e Instrucción Pública) as the regulatory office of the judiciary activity and as the nexus between the President and the Supreme Court, established on Art. 31 of the same code of law.

The following year, on June 11, 1845, the Law no. 41 determined the role of the Attorney General. Initially, this position would be the link between the Secretary of Justice and the Supreme Court.

On 1931, the Secretary was suppressed and its functions on the matter of justice were transferred to the Office of the Attorney General (Procuraduría General de la República). On 1934, the Secretary of State of Justice was reestablished, at the same as the creation of the Secretary of State of Education and Fine Arts taking the functions in the matter of public instruction. During the 1950s, the office was given roles on the subject of labour, being temporarily named Secretary of State of Justice and Labour.

On November 10, 1964, by the Law no. 485, the Secretary of State of Justice was permanently abolished and all its functions were transferred to the Office of the Attorney General.

Affiliated institutions 
The Office of the Attorney General has a number of agencies that work alongside it to improve the judiciary system of the Dominican Republic. These are:

 Attorney's offices from several municipalities
 Specialized Attorney's Offices on:
 Prosecution against money laundering
 Arms control and trafficking
 Persecution of administrative corruption
 Illicit traffic of migrants and human trade
 Environmental defense and natural resources
 High technology crimes and felonies
 Crimes and felonies against health
 Electronic system
 General offices:
 Victim Attention
 Penitentiary and Reformatory Services
 Children, Teenagers and Families
 Investigation on Financial Crimes
 Gender Violence
 Schools:
 Penitentiary National School (ENAP)
 Public Ministry National School
 National System for Conflict Resolution
 Legal Representation System on Victims' Rights (RELEVIC)
 National Institute of Forensics (INACIF)

List of the Attorney Generals of the Republic 

 Jose Manuel Machado (1961)
 Porfirio Nestor Basora Puello (1961-1962)
 Eduardo Antonio García Vásquez (1962-1963)
 Osvaldo B. Soto (1963)
 Manuel Rafael García Lizardo (1963-1964)
 Fernando A. Chalas Valdez (1964-1965)
 Manuel Ramón Morel Cerda (1965)
 Gustavo Gómez Ceara (1965-1966)
 Manuel Rafael García Lizardo (1966-1968)
 Carlos Rafael Goico Morales (1968-1969)
 Anaiboní Guerrero Báez (1970)
 Marino Ariza Hernandez (1970)
 Antonio Grullón Chavez (1971)
 Juan Arístides Taveras Guzmán (1971-1973)
 Fabio Fiallo Cáceres (1973-1975)
 Miguel Angel Luna Morales (1976-1978)
 Alfredo Victoria (1978-1979)
 Flavio Darío Espinal Hued (1979)
 Bienvenido Mejía y Mejía (1979-1982)
 Antonio Rosario (1982-1984)
 Americo Espinal Hued (1984-1986)
 Julio César Castaño Espaillat (1986)
 Ramón González Hardy (1986-1987)
 Pura Luz Núñez Pérez (1987-1988) []
 Semiramis Olivo de Pichardo (1988-1990) []
 Manuel García Lizardo (1991-1992)
 Efraim Reyes Dulac (1992-1995)
 Juan Demostones Cotes Morales (1995)
 Luis Nelson Pantaleón González (1995-1996)
 Ramón Pina Acevedo (1996)
 Abel Rodriguez del Orbe (1996-1998)
 Mariano Mejia  (1998-1999)
 Virgilio Bello Rosa (2000-2003)
 Víctor Céspedes Martínez (2003-2004)
 Francisco Domínguez Brito (2004-2006)
 Radhamés Jiménez (2006-2012)
 Francisco Domínguez Brito (2012-2016)
 Jean Alain Rodríguez Sánchez (2016-2020)
 Miriam Germán Brito (2020–present) []

See also 

 Justice minister
 Politics of the Dominican Republic

References 

Justice ministers